Corporación Cuba Ron is a state-run bottler of Havana Club and other alcoholic beverages in Cuba.

Founded in 1993, it has been under the Cuban Ministry of the Food Industry since 2000.

Operations

 Santa Cruz: liqueurs, as well as mugs and miniature bottles of Havana Club and Cubay rums
 Villa Clara: Cubay rums
 Santiago de Cuba: Santiago de Cuba rum and home to Ron Museum 
 San Cristóba: table wines, other beverages and spirits
 Cerro: Cuba Ron Distribution Centre
 Santa Cruz del Norte: soft drinks, carbonated waters, fruit beverages, yeast production

References

Drink companies of Cuba
Companies established in 1993
Alcohol in Cuba